The 2011 Vuelta a Castilla y León was the 26th edition of the Vuelta a Castilla y León cycle race and was held on 13 April to 17 April 2011. The race started in Medina de Rioseco and finished in Medina del Campo. The race was won by Xavier Tondo.

General classification

References

Vuelta a Castilla y León
Vuelta a Castilla y León by year
2011 in Spanish sport